Acrocercops macaria is a moth of the family Gracillariidae. It is known from Queensland and New South Wales, Australia.

The larvae feed on Acronychia baueri, Acronychia laevis, Euodia micrococca, Halfordia drupifera and Halfordia kendack. They mine the leaves of their host plant. The mine consists of an elongate, gall-like blotch in the deeper tissues of the leaf, rather inflated and showing only as a slightly convex swelling on both leaf surfaces.

References

macaria
Moths of Australia
Moths described in 1913